Albie Selznick (born January 1, 1959) is an American film and television actor. His best-known role is Ben Rubenstein on the sitcom Suddenly Susan and D.A. Owen Pomerantz on Young and the Restless.

He has guest starred and recurred in several other TV series, including The Politician, The Last Tycoon, Grey's Anatomy, How To Get Away With Murder, Dexter, Shark, NCIS, 24, Desperate Housewives, Cold Case, Without A Trace, Star Trek: The Next Generation, Star Trek: Voyager, The King of Queens, NYPD Blue, CSI: Miami, CSI:NY, CSI: Crime Scene Investigation, The West Wing, Everwood, The Young and the Restless, Veronica Mars, Night Court, and others. Albie started his performance career as magician and worked with The Mums for 25 years.

Filmography

Film

Television

References

External links

1959 births
American male film actors
American male television actors
Living people